Pseudohomalenotus bicornutus is a species of harvestmen in a monotypic genus in the family Sclerosomatidae from the Karakoram.

References

Harvestmen
Harvestman genera
Monotypic arachnid genera